Kemal Gülçelik  (1923 – 26 April 1986) was a Turkish football player and assistant manager. He spent all of his senior career at Beşiktaş.

Honours

Beşiktaş
 Istanbul Football League: 1941–42, 1942–43, 1944–45, 1945–46, 1949–50
 Istanbul Football Cup: 1944
 Turkish National Division: 1944, 1947
 Prime Minister's Cup: 1944

Individual
 Turkish National Division top scorer: 1944
Beşiktaş J.K. Squads of Century (Golden Team)

References

External links
 

1923 births
1986 deaths
Footballers from Istanbul
Turkish footballers
Beşiktaş J.K. footballers
Turkish football managers
Association football forwards